Charles Korvin (born Géza Kárpáthi, November 21, 1907 – June 18, 1998) was a Hungarian-American film, television and stage actor. He was also a professional still and motion picture photographer and a master chef.  

Korvin was born in Pöstyén, Kingdom of Hungary (now Piešťany, Slovakia) and studied at the Sorbonne. During his 10 years in France, he was hired by Yvon, the famous French postcard company, shooting on location all over the country. In 1937, he was hired for a CBC documentary film project about the renowned Canadian medical doctor, Norman Bethune. Entitled Heart of Spain, Korvin photographed and co-directed the anti-Franco film which was shot on the front lines during the Spanish Civil War. Moving to the United States in 1940, Korvin studied acting and stagecraft at the Barter Theater in Abingdon, Virginia.  

As Géza Korvin, he made his Broadway stage debut in 1943, playing a Russian nobleman in the play, Dark Eyes. After signing a movie contract with Universal Pictures, he changed his stage name to Charles Korvin.

He worked steadily through the 1940s, including appearing in three films with actress Merle Oberon. He was a victim of the blacklist around 1952, when he refused to testify before the HUAC, and his film career halted. 

Turning to the newly burgeoning, and much less political, field of broadcast television, Korvin starred in early productions for Playhouse 90, Studio One, and US Steel Hour. He played The Eagle for six contiguous episodes on Disney's Zorro and played Latin dance instructor Carlos on The Honeymooners episode "Mama Loves Mambo". In 1960, he starred as Inspector Duval in the UK/US television series Interpol Calling produced by J. Arthur Rank. During these years, Korvin returned to off-Broadway theater starring as the king in Rodgers and Hammerstein's The King and I with runs at the Westbury Music Fair and the St. Louis Municipal Opera Theatre (co-starring Betty White). He was back on Broadway in the mid-1960s starring as the upstairs neighbor in Neil Simon’s Tony Award winning play, “Barefoot in the Park”. In 1964, he returned to Hollywood to play the ship’s captain in Stanley Kramer’s Academy Award winning film, Ship of Fools. Remaining active in later years, he was the voice of the Red Baron for eight years on television and radio ads for Lufthansa Airlines.

Personal life
For more than 25 years, Korvin, with his wife Anne, were part-of-the-year residents in Klosters, Switzerland, where he enjoyed skiing, cooking and entertaining with friends and fellow part time residents Irwin and Marion Shaw, Greta Garbo, Salka Viertel, Deborah Kerr, and Gaetan de Rosnay, among others. Korvin claimed to have been Greta Garbo's last dance partner. 

Julia Child, another long time friend, was interviewed in 1978 by Dick Cavett on his PBS television show. When he asked her to name her favorite “amateur” chef, Child replied, “Charles Korvin”.

Partial filmography

 Enter Arsène Lupin (1944) - Arsene Lupin
 This Love of Ours (1945) - Dr. Michel Touzac
 Temptation (1946) - Mahoud Baroudi
 Berlin Express (1948) - Perrot
 The Killer That Stalked New York (1950) - Matt Krane
 Tarzan's Savage Fury (1952) - Rokov, Russian Agent
 Lydia Bailey (1952) - Col. Gabriel D'autremont
 Sangaree (1953) - Felix Pagnol
 Thunderstorm (1956) - Pablo Gardia
 Ship of Fools (1965) - Capt. Thiele
 The Man Who Had Power Over Women (1970) - Alfred Felix
 Inside Out (1975) - Peter Dohlberg

References

Sources
 Lamparski, R. (1986) Whatever became of ... ? Tenth series, Crown Publishers, Inc.: New York. .

External links
 
 
  (credited as Geza Korvin)
 
 Finding aid of the Charles Korvin photographs, circa 1937-1938 collection at Brandeis University Archives & Special Collections.
Charles Korvin: Erinnerungen eines Hollywoodstars aus Ungarn, by Charles Korvin, published by SYNEMA:Gesellschaft für Film und Medien, 2012

1907 births
1998 deaths
People from Piešťany
American male stage actors
American male film actors
American male television actors
University of Paris alumni
Hungarian emigrants to the United States
20th-century American male actors